Jamin Davis (born December 12, 1998) is an American football linebacker for the Washington Commanders of the National Football League (NFL). He played college football at Kentucky and was drafted by Washington in the first round of the 2021 NFL Draft.

Early life and college
The son of U.S. Army parents, Davis was born on a military base in Honolulu on December 12, 1998. His family moved to Hinesville, Georgia when he was a year old, with Davis later attending Long County High School in Ludowici, Georgia. Playing linebacker and wide receiver for their football team, Davis compiled 131 tackles as a junior and 126 more as a senior while also catching three touchdowns.

A three-star prospect, Davis committed to play college football for the Kentucky Wildcats. He redshirted as a freshman in 2017 and played mostly on special teams in 2018, also recording an interception as a reserve player. He followed with 32 tackles in 2019 before being named as a starter for the 2020 season, where he led the team in tackles with 102 and also recorded 1.5 sacks, a forced fumble, a fumble recovery, and three interceptions, one of which he returned 85 yards for a touchdown.

Professional career

Davis was selected by the Washington Football Team in the first round (19th overall) of the 2021 NFL Draft. He signed his four-year rookie contract on May 13, 2021.

Davis took over as the starting middle linebacker over Cole Holcomb, who suffered an injury, in the Week 10 game against the Philadelphia Eagles. In it, he recovered a fumble that put the Commanders in position to kick a field goal in a victory over the Eagles. He was placed on injured reserve on January 7, 2023, finishing the season with a team-leading 104 tackles, two fumble recoveries, and three sacks.

Personal life
Davis' childhood nickname was "Shadow", named after Shadow from the Sonic the Hedgehog video game franchise. He received the nickname from a close friend and partner in track sprinting nicknamed Sonic, as the two characters are rivals in the franchise. Davis majored in community and leadership development at Kentucky and wore 44 as his Wildcats uniform number to honor his grandmother who died at age 44. He was interning at an attorney's office in Lexington, Kentucky, prior to the start of the COVID-19 pandemic in 2020. Davis is a fan of NASCAR, with his favorite driver being Jimmie Johnson.

References

External links
 
 Washington Commanders bio
 Kentucky Wildcats bio

1998 births
Living people
Players of American football from Georgia (U.S. state)
Players of American football from Honolulu
American football linebackers
Kentucky Wildcats football players
People from Long County, Georgia
African-American players of American football
Washington Commanders players
Washington Football Team players
People from Hinesville, Georgia
21st-century African-American sportspeople